Stermitz is a German surname. Notable people with the surname include:

Evelin Stermitz (born 1972), Austrian artist
Mercedes Stermitz (born 1958), Austrian racing driver

German-language surnames